New York State Route 146B (NY 146B) was a state highway in southern Saratoga County, New York, in the United States. The western terminus of the route was at an intersection with NY 146, its parent route, in the hamlet of Rexford. The eastern terminus of NY 146B was in the hamlet of Groom Corners, where it met Miller and Sugarhill roads. NY 146B was assigned  and removed . Its former routing is now the western portion of County Route 91 (CR 91).

Route description

NY 146B began at an intersection with NY 146 in Rexford, a small riverside hamlet in the town of Clifton Park. The route headed southeastward on Riverview Road, following the northern bank of the Mohawk River (also part of the Erie Canal) through the town. Here, NY 146B turned eastward to follow Grooms Road to the hamlet of Groom Corners, a community based around the intersection of Grooms, Miller and Sugarhill roads. NY 146B ended at this junction; however, Grooms Road continued eastward to a junction with U.S. Route 9 (US 9) in the town of Halfmoon.

History
On July 11, 1916, the state of New York let a contract for improving a series of roadways linking Groom Corners to Waite Corners by way of Rexford Flats (now Rexford). Approximately half of the project was complete by 1920, while the remainder was completed by 1926. In the 1930 renumbering of state highways in New York, the portion of the Groom Corners–Waite Corners highway from Rexford to Waite Corners became part of the new NY 146. The remainder of the highway from Rexford to Groom Corners was designated as NY 146B, a spur route of NY 146, . NY 146B remained unchanged until , when the designation was removed from the highway. The former routing of NY 146B is now part of CR 91, which continues eastward on Grooms Road to meet US 9 in the town of Halfmoon. Additionally, the Riverview Road portion of old NY 146B is now part of the Mohawk Towpath Scenic Byway, a National Scenic Byway.

Major intersections

See also

References

External links

146B
Transportation in Saratoga County, New York